The 2018–19 season was PAOK Football Club's 93rd in existence and the club's 60th consecutive season in the top flight of Greek football. The team won the Super League unbeaten, defended their Greek Football Cup title won in 2018, and also competed in the UEFA Champions League and UEFA Europa League.

Coaching staff

Other information

|-

Players

Squad information

Players in

Total spending:  €9.3M

Players out

 Total Income: €10.9MNet income:  €1.6M

Pre-season

Competitions

Overview

Managerial statistics

Super League Greece

League table

Results summary

Results by round

Matches

• Man of the Match as has been voted by PAOK fans on official PAOK website and mobile app.

Greek Football Cup

PAOK entered the competition as the two-time defending champions, having won consecutive editions in 2016–17 and 2017–18.

Group stage

Round of 16

Quarter-finals

Semi-finals

Final

UEFA Champions League

Second qualifying round

Third qualifying round

Play-off round

UEFA Europa League

Group stage

Group stage (Group L)

Statistics

Squad statistics

! colspan="13" style="background:#DCDCDC; text-align:center" | Goalkeepers
|-

! colspan="13" style="background:#DCDCDC; text-align:center" | Defenders
|-

! colspan="13" style="background:#DCDCDC; text-align:center" | Midfielders
|-

! colspan="13" style="background:#DCDCDC; text-align:center" | Forwards
|-

! colspan="13" style="background:#DCDCDC; text-align:center" | Players transferred out during the season
|-

|}

Goalscorers

Most assists

Clean sheets

Disciplinary record

Awards

Fans' Man of the Match award
As has been voted by PAOK fans on official PAOK website and mobile app.

Player of the Month award

Awarded monthly to the player that was chosen by fans voting on paokfc.gr

Season MVP award

Best Goal of the season award

See also
List of unbeaten football club seasons

References

External links
 PAOK FC official website

PAOK FC seasons
PAOK
PAOK FC
PAOK FC
Greek football championship-winning seasons